Cold in the Earth (1992) is Ann Granger's third Mitchell and Markby Mystery. Set in rural England, it is about three seemingly unconnected deaths which occur in quick succession in the fictitious town of Bamford in the Cotswolds. Chief Inspector Alan Markby and his team are unofficially joined in their investigations by Meredith Mitchell—who is introduced in Say It with Poison—, who leaves her London job to spend Holy Week in the country.

Plot summary

The first death is from a drug overdose; the victim is a promising young girl from a respectable local family. However, Markby's investigations, which aim at getting hold of the suppliers, do not lead anywhere. Shortly afterwards, the body of a stranger, possibly a foreigner, is found buried in a shallow grave in a trench at a building site on the outskirts of Bamford. Finally, a local construction foreman employed at that very building site is slain to death on a lonely country road.

Mitchell and Markby probe into the dubious roles played by land developers, diehard farmers and juvenile delinquents alike.

1992 British novels
British crime novels
Novels by Ann Granger
Headline Publishing Group books